Francesco Zappa is a 1984 album by Frank Zappa. It features chamber music by the Italian composer Francesco Zappa, who composed between 1763 and 1788.

Album origins
David Ocker played a piece of Francesco Zappa's music for Frank Zappa because it was popular with some college music students. Because Francesco's music was not published and could only be found in the Mormon library, Frank decided to publish it. He then programmed some of these pieces into his new Synclavier synthesizer.

Finding the composer's works
Frank found an entry for Francesco in the Grove Dictionary of Music and Musicians and then researched his sheet music in the library at UC Berkeley. According to The Real Frank Zappa Book, the two musicians are not related.

Album content
Francesco Zappa was the first full album on which Frank used the Synclavier, but Synclavier pieces appear on "The Perfect Stranger" and on "Thing-Fish" as well.

Track listing
All selections composed by Francesco Zappa.

Personnel
Performed by The Barking Pumpkin Digital Gratification Consort (Frank Zappa, conductor)
Produced and orchestrated by Frank Zappa
Synclavier document encryption: David Ocker
Engineered by Bob Stone & Mark Pinske
Cover painting by Donald Roller Wilson
Collage by Gabrielle Raumberger
Graphics by New Age Art

References

External links
Album details
Release information

1984 albums
Albums conducted by Frank Zappa
Albums produced by Frank Zappa
Barking Pumpkin Records albums
Frank Zappa albums
Tribute albums
Covers albums